The Square was a London fine dining restaurant, opened on 13 December 1991 in St James's. Since the opening, it had been co-owned by chef Phil Howard and wine expert Nigel Platts-Martin. It also earned its Michelin star in 1994 and had held it from then. After it relocated to Mayfair in February 1997, The Square held two Michelin stars from 1998 to 2016, the same year when Howard and Platts-Martin sold it to a company held by Marlon Abela. After regaining its first Michelin star in 2017, it has been closed since 31 January 2020, leading to its star loss the following year.

Background
Former Oxford-educated lawyer Nigel Platts-Martin and chef Marco Pierre White, co-owners of Harveys, planned to establish a second restaurant located at West End. Platts-Martin and White's partnership of the project fell through. Furthermore, profits of the critically acclaimed Harveys were less than expected, disappointing Platts-Martin.

Phil Howard graduated from the University of Kent with a degree in microbiology but then, out of passion, pursued his cooking career. Before the project, Howard started working at Harveys as a chef de partie in 1989. White sacked Howard after nine months of work. Howard shifted to another restaurant Bibendum as a chef de partie under head chef Simon Hopkinson. Howard was then rehired by White in 1990 to work at Harveys especially in order to be trained for White and Platts-Martin's upcoming second restaurant.

1991–1997: St James's
Phil Howard and Nigel Platts-Martin, both inexperienced in operating a restaurant at a time, opened without Marco Pierre White what became known as The Square at 32 King Street, St James's, SW1 on 13 December 1991 near St James's Square, which inspired the name of the restaurant. Howard became the head chef since The Square's debut, and his cooking style had been contemporary French with simplicity and elegance. A restaurant critic Jonathan Meades in June 1992 described the original St James's location as "big, spacious, quirky" and its interior design as "pretty startling and very boldly coloured" with "[a] giantess's ear-ring hang[ing] [at a] window" and multiple gold leaf decorations.

Sales of The Square within one year since its debut were initially poor, but the restaurant became financially successful thereafter. The restaurant earned its first Michelin star in December 1994. The New York Times food critic Catharine Reynolds in November 1995 wrote, "The dining room is screened from the street by variegated ivy topiary and dangling metal spirals charitably described as gypsy earrings gone wrong".

The Square's menu had changed monthly, including courses. In November 1995, The Square served eight first course dishes, including "seared tuna with a tartare of vegetables and soy-wilted greens and a warm salad of gam[é] and chestnuts" served. In that same period, "crisp-fried vegetables" was one of second courses; venison with "mashed potatoes and carmeli[s]ed onions", one of main courses. Among the desserts, most of them "fruit-based", were a pithivier of prune purée "dosed with Armagnac" and a "sablé of raspberries".

1997–2016: Relocation to Mayfair

The Square was relocated to 6-10 Bruton Street, Mayfair, W1J on 17 February 1997. Ben Rogers of The Independent in May 1997 described the Mayfair relocation as "very ritzy" and "appeal[ing] to the smart, international crowd". Rogers further said that the interior design of the newer location at the time contained "parquet flooring, variously coloured walls—some rendered, some white, one a rusty red—some colourful modern art, ugly brown upholstered chairs, one vaguely art-deco column and, as a centrepiece, a large bevelled mirror doing nothing in particular."

Mark Bittman of The New York Times in February 2001 noted the cuisine being "simply modern" more than "modern French", "large abstract oil paintings", and tables with flowers on top and covered by "skirts of dark crepe velvet" and "crisp linen".

In the mid-2000s, the interior design was refurbished.

2016: The Square sold to Abela
When the financial crisis of 2007–2008 occurred, The Square's lunch business had been affected for a long term. After multimillion-pound Mayfair eateries Sexy Fish and Park Chinois debuted in 2015, rents and premium rates increased for offices and other restaurants around the area, like The Square and Hibiscus.

Howard later in 2016 opened a new restaurant Elystan Street, whose menu is less complex than The Square's, with his business partner Rebecca Mascarenhas. It was the former site of chef Tom Aikens's eponymous restaurant in Chelsea, London. Elystan Street earned its first Michelin star in October 2017.

Menu (Mayfair)
The Square had offered seasonal (monthly or otherwise) menus, which had been originally done since its debut in St James's, set in a single price. Either The Square's list of wines, champagne, and burgundy, guided by a sommelier, had been at least eighty (or eighty-one) pages long, or amount of wines (starting from £18.50 house wine) in the list had been at least 400.

In March 1998, nine dishes were offered for each of at least two or three courses as well as desserts. A "velouté of truffles with tortellini of girolles and parmesan" was one of amuse-bouches. Starter course choices for two-course meal included "roast foie gras with caramelised endive and muscat grapes" and "a sauté of scallops and langoustines with chanterelles". Main course choices for the two-course included "herb-crusted saddle of lamb with white-bean puree and garlic" and "roast Bresse pigeon with a tarragon mousseline and foie gras".

In February 2001, one of amuse-bouches was a "chilled cucumber soup [...] with a hint of celery". Among the first-course choices were "seasoned scallop-mussel soup" ("nage", according to the menu) "with white wine", and a "bresaola (dried beef), with a salad of haricot verts, favas, tomatoes and potatoes". Among the main-course choice were "a crisp-seared halibut in butter, with very buttery whipped potatoes and a sauce of chives, white wine and baby shrimp"; and "a huge pile of lamb, mostly shoulder, some roasted and some stewed, along with white beans, confited tomatoes, lots of rosemary, garlic and spinach [...] topped with a little sweetbread". Among desserts were an "apricot-almond tart" and "a shortbread sandwich filled with strawberries and crème fraîche [served] with [...] vanilla ice cream".

In September 2015, a two-course lunch meal was £35; three-course lunch, £40; three-course meal taken from à la carte menu, £95. Within a few years prior, slightly less salt and less dairy (like butter and cream) had been used on dishes.

Howard wrote two volumes of The Square: The Cookbook: first volume Savoury released in 2012; second Sweet in 2013.

Chefs under Howard and Platts-Martin

Head chefs
The Square had gone through various head chefs while Howard had been its chef patron throughout most of his tenure. Rob Weston was one of the restaurant's chefs from December 1991 to 1993/1994. After working for three other world-class restaurants in London and Paris, Weston became its head chef in 1997 or 1998. In February 2013, Weston left The Square to become the head chef of a Chiswick restaurant La Trompette, owned by Nigel Platts-Martin and Bruce Poole, which was reopened later that period after refurbishment.

Australian chef Josh Pelham worked previously as a sous-chef of Kitchen W8, one of restaurants owned by Phil Howard, which earned its first Michelin star in 2011. Pelham was promoted head chef as announced in early March 2013. Pelham was reported in August 2013 to have taken the lower role of senior sous-chef since then. In March 2014, Pelham left The Square for a Melbourne restaurant.

Gary Foulkes, one of The Square's sous chef from 2005 to 2011, then succeeded Pelham in late March 2013 after Foulkes's two-year world travelling. Foulkes left The Square in March 2016 when it was sold to MARC. Foulkes later became the executive chef of Angler at South Place Hotel, owned by D&D London, in June 2016.

Other chefs
The Square had other previous chefs. One of the previous sous chefs was Neil Borthwick, husband of Angela Hartnett. Another was Australian chef Brett Graham, who started working at The Square in 2001 and became junior sous-chef in 2002. Graham left The Square to become the head chef (and then became chef patron) of The Ledbury, which opened in 2005 and has been co-owned by Phil Howard and Nigel Platts-Martin.

Mark Kempson was a sous-chef for more than two years until 2009. Kempson became the head chef of Kitchen W8, which opened on 28 October 2009 under co-ownership of Howard and Rebecca Mascarenhas.

Bruce Poole worked at the original St James's location of The Square as one of chefs until January 1994. Poole would eventually establish a few restaurants, such as Chez Bruce (replacement site of Harveys), with The Square co-owner Nigel Platts-Martin as Poole's business partner.

Jun Tanaka previously worked at The Square as one of chefs. In September 2001, Tanaka became the head chef of his restaurant QC, which opened in that period and later reopened as Pearl in May 2004.

Reception under Howard's tenure
James Villas of Town & Country in June 1996 praised "Howard's brilliant, highly personal approach to modern British cookery" that had resulted in "intelligent, well-balanced" dishes. The Times restaurant critic Sheila Keating in November 1997 described his dishes as "exquisitely complex", which she found was one of reasons for the first Michelin star (1994). Another reviewer of The Times in October 2003 praised Howard's "striking modern twists" on French classical cuisine, like "seared loin of venison with deep-fried quail's egg and a salad of beetroot and apple".

The Square earned its second Michelin star in January 1998. It had also held four Rosettes by AA plc from 2007 to 2016 and eight out of ten by the Good Food Guide from 1999 to 2016. The Square was also awarded the BMW SquareMeal Restaurant of the Year in 2001 and 2007 and ranked seventh Britain's best restaurant at the 2012 National Restaurant Awards.

The Times named The Square in October 2003 one of top twenty "Haute cuisine restaurants" and in March 2007 one of top ten "restaurants for wine". The Times ranked the restaurant out of top 100 British restaurants number 12 in 2010 with a score of 9.63 out of ten, number 15 in 2011 with a 9.57 score, and number 18 in 2012. The Times in 2013 ranked it fifth out of top ten restaurants for desserts and number 22 out of top 100 British restaurants with a 9.57 score, noting Howard's unwillingness "to tamper with the classic French flavour combinations, tried and tested over generations" and criticism toward "modern restaurant cooking [that] has a tendency to ". The Times ranked it down to number 35 in 2014 with a score of 9.54 and then number 42 in 2015 with a 9.52 score, praising its " 'highly innovative' cuisine".

Survey of diners by Zagat, released in November 2006, rated the food 27 out of 30, decor 22, and service 26.

A. A. Gill in 2016 noted that most of the customers had been businesspeople and their clients. Participants of surveys conducted by Harden's often placed The Square as one of top five London restaurants for business meetings: second in 2005 (edition), fourth in 2006, fifth in 2007, second in 2014, third in 2015, third in 2016, and second in 2017 (tied with Bleeding Heart Restaurant).

Survey participants conducted by Harden's ranked The Square the 15th most mentioned London restaurant and the eighth top London restaurant with "gastronomic experience" in 2015 (edition). They further ranked the restaurant the 17th most mentioned London restaurant in 2017.

Co-owner Nigel Platts-Martin
One of The Square's co-owners, German-born Nigel Platts-Martin, whose father was an Army officer, attended The King's School, Canterbury and then the University of Oxford to study law. Later, he went on to work for law firms Freshfields Bruckhaus Deringer and S. G. Warburg & Co. before leaving to launch the restaurant Harveys in 1987 with its head chef Marco Pierre White. Under White and Platts-Martin as co-owners, Harveys earned its first Michelin star in January 1988 and then its second in January 1990. Then Platts-Martin and one of White's proteges Phil Howard established The Square in late 1991.

In 1992 or 1993, Platts-Martin and another shareholder bought remaining shares of Harveys from White, who left Harveys in July 1993. In February 1995, Platts-Martin and Bruce Poole, The Square's then-employee until January 1994, established Chez Bruce as the replacement of Harveys at Wandsworth Common. Chez Bruce earned its first Michelin star in early 1999. Platts-Martin and Poole also opened The Glasshouse at Kew in early 1999 and La Trompette in Chiswick in late January 2001. The Glasshouse earned its first Michelin star in 2002 under its first head chef Anthony Boyd. La Trompette has held one Michelin star since January 2008 under various head chefs, including (since 2013) The Square's former head chef Rob Weston.

Platts-Martin won the Independent Restaurateur of the Year at the 2004 Catey Awards for "quality, consistency and innovation" of his restaurants. He was appointed Member of the Most Excellent Order of the British Empire (MBE) at the 2009 New Year Honours for serving the British hospitality industry. Out of top 100 most influential people in the UK hospitality industry, The Caterer ranked Platts-Martin 72nd in 2005, 24nd in 2010, 40th in 2011, and 35th in 2012. A magazine Restaurant ranked him 18th out of "100 most powerful people in the restaurant industry" in April 2016. Based on a 2006 survey of 8,000 participants, Harden's named Platts-Martin's restaurant group one of top three in London for "sheer consistency". The other two groups were that of Gordon Ramsay and of Caprice Group, owned by Richard Caring at the time.

2016–2020: Marlon Abela

Post-transfer history
Under Marlon Abela's ownership, the restaurant lost its two Michelin stars in October 2016. After the August 2017 closure for renovations, the restaurant regained its first Michelin star in 2017 around the time of the October 2017 reopening.

In 2019, the Marlon Abela Restaurant Corporation (MARC) reported 2017 net losses and unpaid accounts. On 8 January 2020, MARC was liquidated after the High Court of Justice granted the HM Revenue and Customs's petition filed on 6 November 2019. On 31 January 2020, property administrators abruptly closed The Square and another MARC-owned place Morton's Club during their lunch hours. The administrators also seized other properties and assets of MARC, including Michelin-starred The Greenhouse, which has been closed as of late June 2020. Since its indefinite closure, The Square lost its Michelin star in January 2021.

Post-2016 reception
In December 2017, Ben McCormack of The Telegraph wrote that The Square was not the same signature restaurant associated with chef Phil Howard and that the soul of The Square departed when Howard moved to Elystan Street, where he currently operates. Nonetheless, McCormark appreciated Abela's efforts to run the "formal fine dining" restaurant, which "is an increasingly narrow and niche market". The Week restaurant critic in February 2018 said that the "stylish" food lacked flavour. For example, both sirloin steak and roast lamb "looked stunning, but tasted indistinguishable".

Head chefs under Abela
During MARC's ownership, Dan Fletcher, The Square's sous chef under Howard, was promoted the head chef in March 2016. In September 2016, Japanese-born Yu Sugimoto succeeded Fletcher. Sugimoto left the position in August 2017 before the restaurant's refurbishment and returned to Japan for his family. The Square's final head chef was Clément Leroy from November 2017 to its January 2020 closure.

References
General
 
 

Notes

Further reading
 
 
 
 
 
  Also accessible via .

External links
 
 

European restaurants in London
1991 establishments in England
2020 disestablishments in England
Michelin Guide starred restaurants in the United Kingdom
Restaurants established in 1991
Restaurants disestablished in 2020
Fine dining
Defunct French restaurants in the United Kingdom